The Best (TC: 壹精選) is the first greatest-hits album by Hong Kong singer Edmond Leung.

Track listing
"No.1" (第一位)
"Love Once and Forever" (一世一次戀愛)
"Miss You All" (想念你的一切)
"Thinking of You" (想着你等着你 - 94 unplugged)
"100% In Love with You" (一百巴仙愛上你 - 第101次Remix)
"Tie Me Up, Tie Me Down" (綑着我困着我 - 縛縛Remix)
"Summer No No No" (夏季不不不)
"Don't Want to Be Alone" (不願一個人)
"Hesitantly" (欲言又止)
"One Night In A Certain Month" (某月某夜)
"Lingering Games" (纏綿遊戲)
"Rainy Night" (流離夜雨...雨中花)
"No.1" (remix)

Charts

References

Edmond Leung albums
1994 albums